'Skinny' Shannon Culver (born October 5, 1971) is a former Canadian Football League Wide receiver for the Baltimore Stallions (1994–95) Spring Football League  Los Angeles Dragons (2000), XFL Orlando Rage (2001) and  Arena Football League wide receiver for Anaheim Piranhas (1997), the Grand Rapids Rampage (1998), the Los Angeles Avengers (2000–2001), the Dallas Desperados (2002–2003), and the Austin Wranglers (2004). He then signed with the Arizona Rattlers after taking the 2005 season off. Culver played college football for the Oklahoma State Cowboys and Los Angeles Pierce College.

High school career
Culver attended Palmdale High School in Palmdale, California, and was an All-League, and an All-CIF selection.

References

External links
Just Sports Stats
Shannon Culver at ArenaFan Online

1971 births
Living people
Sportspeople from Los Angeles County, California
American football wide receivers
Oklahoma State Cowboys football players
Anaheim Piranhas players
Grand Rapids Rampage players
Los Angeles Avengers players
Dallas Desperados players
Austin Wranglers players
Players of American football from California
Orlando Rage players
People from Palmdale, California